Kansal is a surname originating in northern India. It is one of the Gotra of Agarwal tribe.

According to legend, King Agrasen had 18 children and divided his kingdom among them, hence establishing the 18 gotras. Collectively, the 18 gotras are known as Agarwal, one of the most influential trading communities in northern India. During the Mughal rule, and during the British East India Company administration, some Agrawals migrated to Bihar and Calcutta, who became the major component of the Marwaris

The Agarwal caste is also popularly known as Baniya. Members of the Agrawal community are known for their extraordinary business skills and have for many years been influential and prosperous in India. Even in modern-day tech and ecommerce companies, they continue to dominate. It was reported in 2013, that for every 100 in funding for e-commerce companies in India, 40 went to firms founded by Agarwals

Prominent contributors in business

 Anil Agarwal, founder and chairman of Vedanta Limited
 Radhe Shyam Agarwal, co-founder and executive chairman of  Emami
 Raamdeo Agrawal, co founder of Motilal Oswal Group
 Sanjay Agarwal, MD & CEO of AU Small Finance Bank
 Narendra Bansal, founder and owner of Intex Technologies
 Naresh Goyal, founder, Jet Airways
 Subhash Chandra, chairman of Essel Group
 Sanjay Dalmia, chairman of Dalmia group
 Rohtas Goel, founder of Omaxe
 Qimat Rai Gupta,Founder and MD Havells
 Om Prakash Jindal, founder and owner of the Jindal Group
 Savitri Jindal, chairperson of JSW Steel
 Lakshman Das Mittal, owner and chairman of Sonalika Group
 Lakshmi Mittal, chairman and CEO of ArcelorMittal
 Som Mittal, former president of NASSCOM
 Sunil Mittal,  founder and chairman of Bharti Airtel
 Ritesh Agarwal, founder and CEO, Oyo Rooms
 Bhavish Aggarwal, co-founder and CEO, Ola Cabs
 Dinesh Agarwal, founder and CEO of IndiaMART
 Parag Agrawal, CEO of Twitter
 Anjali Bansal, founder, Avaana Capital
 Binny Bansal,  co-founder, Flipkart
 Jyoti Bansal, founder, AppDynamics
 Mukesh Bansal, co-founder and former CEO, Myntra, co-founder and CEO Cure Fit
 Rohit Bansal, co-founder and COO, Snapdeal
 Sachin Bansal, co-founder, Flipkart
 Kavin Bharti Mittal, founder, hike Messenger

See also
Aggarwal
Vaishya

References

Gotras of Agarwal
Indian surnames